Armand de Rohan (Armand Gaston Maximilien; 26 June 1674 – 19 July 1749) was a French churchman and politician. He became Bishop of Strasbourg in 1704, Cardinal in 1712 then Grand Almoner of France in 1713 and member of the regency council in 1722.

He constructed the Hôtel de Rohan next to the present day Hôtel de Soubise in which his father lived, employing his father's architect, Pierre-Alexis Delamair. 

The prince de Rohan was elected a member of the Académie des Inscriptions in 1701 and of the Académie française in 1703. He was made a commander of the Saint-Esprit in 1713.

He gave last rites (confession, viaticum, and unction) to king Louis XIV.

See also 
 Palais Rohan

References

Bibliography 
 Claude Muller, Le siècle des Rohan : une dynastie de cardinaux en Alsace au XVIII|e, La Nuée Bleue, Strasbourg, 2006, 446 p.

External links
 Académie française

1674 births
1749 deaths
Armand Gaston Maximilien de Rohan
18th-century French cardinals
Bishops of Strasbourg
Members of the Académie des Inscriptions et Belles-Lettres
Members of the Académie Française